Lithalsa is a frost-induced raised land form in permafrost areas with mineral-rich soils, where a perennial ice lens has developed within the soil. The term sometimes also refers to palsas and pingos.

References

External links
 Stone Circles Explained, about stone structures created by frost heaving

Geomorphology
Glaciology
Ground freezing
Palsas
Patterned grounds
Periglacial landforms
Soil